Lionel Walden (c. 1653 – 15 April 1701), of Huntingdon, was an English soldier and Member of Parliament.

Walden was born around 1653, the only son of Sir Lionel Walden and  Elizabeth Balaam. He was admitted to Trinity College, Cambridge as a fellow commoner on 3 July 1671, and later transferred to Corpus Christi. Travelling abroad in 1673, he returned to spend a year as a captain in the Earl of Northampton's foot regiment, before being admitted to the Inner Temple on 27 November 1675.

In October 1679, Walden was elected to represent Huntingdon in the House of Commons and retained his seat in the elections of 1681 and 1685. He was a supporter of James II and raised an independent troop of horse during the Monmouth Rebellion. He remained a Jacobite after the Glorious Revolution, and was arrested in 1690 but released after the intercession of Lord Nottingham. He died on 15 April 1781, and was buried at All Saints' Church, Huntingdon.

Walden was married, at some date after 1684, to Elizabeth daughter of Sir John Cotton. They had three sons and two daughters, though two of the sons died before their father. The surviving son fought for James Francis Edward Stuart in the Jacobite rising of 1715 and died unmarried in 1719.

References

1653 births
1701 deaths
Alumni of Trinity College, Cambridge
Alumni of Corpus Christi College, Cambridge
English MPs 1679
Members of the Parliament of England (pre-1707) for constituencies in Huntingdonshire
English MPs 1681
English MPs 1685–1687
Members of Lincoln's Inn